Back to the Future, or Brideshead Revisitted Revisitted is a 1998 CD which compiles studio out-takes, home recordings, live tracks and various odds and ends by Country Teasers. The album is out of print.

Track listing 
All songs written by B.R. Wallers except where noted.
"Let's Have a Shambles"
"Good Pair of Hands"
"Kill!"
"No Limits" (2 Unlimited)
"I Get Hard"
"Tights"
"Go Down Might Devil"
"The Risk"
"Get Your Hole"
"Milkman"
"I Know My Name Is There" (Daniel Sidney Warner/Barney E. Warren)
"Women & Children 1st" (live)
"Lies" (live)
"Tainted Love" (live) (Ed Cobb)
"Axe Greenan" (live)
"Drove a Truck" (live)
"Prettiest Slave on the Barge" (live)
"Country Roads" (live) (John Denver/Bill Danoff/Taffy Nivert)

Personnel
B. R. Wallers - Voice & Guitar
Alan. K. Crichton - Guitars (1-7,9,12-17), Voice (8)
Simon W. Stephens - Bass (1-7,9,17)
Mark Carr - Drums (1-4)
George Miller - Drums (5, part 1 of 6)
A.C. "Eck" King - Drums (part 2 of 6,9,12-18)
Richard C.W. Greenan - Guitar (7, 12-16), Voice (8)
Aleister Josephh Robert MacKinven - Bass (12-16)

Country Teasers albums
1998 compilation albums